The Ohio State Buckeyes softball team represents Ohio State University in NCAA Division I college softball.  The team participates in the Big Ten Conference. The Buckeyes are currently led by head coach Kelly Kovach Schoenly. The team plays its home games at Buckeye Field located on the university's campus.

History

Coaching history

Championships

Conference championships

Conference tournament championships

Coaching staff

Notable players
Big Ten Player of the Year
Wendy Allen, 2002

Big Ten Freshman of the Year
Wendy Allen, 2001
Melanie Nichols, 2010

Big Ten Coach of the Year
Gail Davenport, 1990
Linda Kalafatis, 2002
Linda Kalafatis, 2007

References